Las Hilanderas ("The Spinners") is a painting by the Spanish painter Diego Velázquez, in the Museo del Prado of Madrid, Spain. It is also known by the title The Fable of Arachne.  It is usually regarded as a late work by the artist, dating from around 1657.

Traditionally, it was believed that the painting depicted women workers in the tapestry workshop of Santa Isabel.  In 1948, however, Diego Angula observed that the iconography suggested Ovid's Fable of Arachne, the story of the mortal Arachne who dared to challenge the goddess Athena to a weaving competition and, on winning the contest, was turned into a spider by the jealous goddess. This is now generally accepted as the correct interpretation of the painting.

It was painted for Don Pedro de Arce, huntsman to King Philip IV.  It entered the Spanish royal collection in the eighteenth century, and was probably damaged by the fire at the Royal Alcazar of Madrid in 1734. New sections were added at the sides (37 cm in total) and over 50 cm to the top of the canvas.  The painting remains at the extended size but is currently (in November 2013) displayed behind a screen with a frame added over a cut-away section revealing only the original dimensions.

Stylistic elements, such as the lightness, the economical use of paint, and the clear influence of the Italian Baroque, have led many scholars to assert that it was painted in 1657. Others place it earlier, at some time between 1644–50, perhaps because certain aspects of its form and content recall the bodegones Velázquez painted in his early career.

In Las Hilanderas, Velázquez developed a layered composition, an approach he had often used in his earlier bodegones, such as the Kitchen Scene with Christ in the House of Martha and Mary. In the foreground is the contest. The goddess Athena, disguised as an old woman, is on the left and Arachne, in a white top facing away from the viewer, is on the right. Three helpers assist them. In the background, a raised platform (perhaps a stage) displays the finished tapestries. The one visible to us is Arachne's, showing The Rape of Europa — another Greek myth. This is in fact a copy of Titian's painting of the subject, which was in the Spanish royal collection.

The painting has been interpreted as an allegory of the arts and even as a commentary on the range of creative endeavor, with the fine arts represented by the goddess and the crafts represented by Arachne.  Others think that Velázquez' message was simply that to create great works of art, both great creativity and hard technical work are required. Other scholars have read political allegories into the work and interpreted it through popular culture.

References

Sources

Bird, Wendy. "The Bobbin and the Distaff", Apollo, 2007-11-01

External links

"Enslaved sovereign": aesthetics of power in Foucault, Velazquez and Ovid. Article by Sira Dambe, Journal of Literary Studies, December 1, 2006
Spanish Culture Official Website in English
Velázquez , exhibition catalog from The Metropolitan Museum of Art (fully available online

Paintings by Diego Velázquez in the Museo del Prado
Cats in art
Musical instruments in art
Paintings based on Metamorphoses
Spanish royal collection